"Unpredictable" is a song by American entertainer Jamie Foxx. It was written by Derrick "Bigg D" Baker, Christopher Bridges, Harold Lilly, and Jim Jonsin for his same-titled second studio album (2005), while production was helmed by Baker, Lilly, and Jonsin. It was released as the album's second single in 2005. It features additional vocals by rapper Ludacris. "Unpredictable" samples "Wildflower" and "Wild Flower (Suite)" by American funk and R&B group New Birth. A commercial success, it peaked number eight on the US Billboard Hot 100.

Chart performance
Unpredictable debuted at number 100 on the US Billboard Hot 100 chart, on the week of May 6, 2006. After climbing for the chart for 11 weeks, the song eventually reached its peak at number eight on the chart, the week of February 11, 2006. This became Foxx's first US top-ten single as a lead artist. The song also peaked at number two on the US Hot R&B/Hip-Hop Songs chart in February 2006. On June 14, 2006, the single was certified platinum by the Recording Industry Association of America (RIAA) for sales of over a million copies in the United States.

In the United Kingdom, the single peaked at number 16 on the UK Singles Chart on April 16, 2006. This became Foxx's highest charting song in UK as a lead artist.

Track listing
UK CD

 "Unpredictable" (album version) - 3:39
 "Unpredictable" (The Roger Athelston mix) - 3:40
 "Unpredictable" (Mayhem Reggae mix) - 4:18
 "Unpredictable" (CD-ROM video) 

US 12"
A-side:

 A1. "Unpredictable" (Mayhem Reggae mix) - 4:17
 A2. "Unpredictable" (Mayhem instrumental) - 4:17

B-side:

 B1. "Unpredictable" (The Roger Athelston mix) - 3:41
 B2. "Unpredictable" (The Roger Athelston instrumental) - 3.41
 B3. "Unpredictable" (radio edit) (main) - 3:39

Charts

Weekly charts

Year-end charts

Certifications

References

2005 singles
Jamie Foxx songs
Ludacris songs
Music videos directed by Hype Williams
Songs written by Jim Jonsin
Songs written by Harold Lilly (songwriter)
Songs written by Bigg D
2005 songs